Louis-Marie Baader (20 June 1828, Lannion - 2 December 1920, Morlaix) was a French painter of German descent.

Life
The son of a German musician (serving in comte Jacques Boudin de Tromelin's regiment) and his Norman wife, the count saw Louis-Marie's artistic potential early and with his support he entered the École des beaux-arts in Paris in 1848, in Adolphe Yvon's studio. Initially he gained several church and private commissions, but he only exhibited at the Paris Salon from 1857 to 1914. In 1866 he won a medal for Hero and Leander and a third class medal in 1874 for Posthumous Glory, allowing him to sell several paintings to the French state. He worked for a long time as a history painter, but later moved into genre work, especially on Breton life, before ending his career painting military history paintings. He died unmarried and is buried in the cimetière Saint-Charles in Morlaix.

See also
Remorse (Baader painting)

Sources
Durox Cyrielle and Riou Béatrice, Au Salon ! Louis-Marie Baader (1828-1920), exhibition catalogue, Musée de Morlaix, juin 2013, 120p.

1828 births
1920 deaths
19th-century French painters
20th-century French painters
19th-century French male artists
20th-century French male artists
French people of German descent
People from Lannion